The Downtown Lawrence Historic District is a historic district roughly bounded by MA 110, Methuen, Lawrence and Jackson Streets in Lawrence, Massachusetts.  The district encompasses the historic civic and commercial heart of the city, with a series of commercial and civic building built mainly between 1880 and 1920, as well as the Campagnone Common, one of the city's largest public parks.  Civic buildings, including City Hall and the Essex County Courthouse, face the Common on Common Street, and brick commercial buildings in late 19th-century Romanesque and Queen Anne styles mix with later Colonial and Classical Revival buildings on Essex Street, one block removed from the Common.

The district was added to the National Register of Historic Places in 1979.

See also
National Register of Historic Places listings in Lawrence, Massachusetts
National Register of Historic Places listings in Essex County, Massachusetts

References

National Register of Historic Places in Lawrence, Massachusetts
Historic districts in Essex County, Massachusetts
Historic districts on the National Register of Historic Places in Massachusetts